This list of botanical gardens and arboretums in Mississippi is intended to include all significant botanical gardens and arboretums in the U.S. state of Mississippi

See also
List of botanical gardens and arboretums in the United States

References 

 
Arboreta in Mississippi
botanical gardens and arboretums in Mississippi